Antônio Carlos Souza da Silva Júnior (born 17 September 1994), known as Antônio Carlos, is a Brazilian professional footballer who played as a as a left back.

Football career
Born in Belo Horizonte, Minas Gerais, Antônio Carlos emerged through local Cruzeiro Esporte Clube's youth system. On 24 January 2015 he was loaned to Portuguese club C.S. Marítimo, but was all but associated to the B-team during his spell in Madeira, scoring through a penalty kick in a 1–1 away draw against Sporting Clube de Portugal B as they were eventually relegated from the Segunda Liga.

References

External links

1994 births
Living people
Footballers from Belo Horizonte
Brazilian footballers
Association football defenders
Cruzeiro Esporte Clube players
Villa Nova Atlético Clube players
Liga Portugal 2 players
C.S. Marítimo players
Red Bull Brasil players
Clube Atlético Patrocinense players
Brazilian expatriate footballers
Expatriate footballers in Portugal
Brazilian expatriate sportspeople in Portugal